is a waterfall in Yōrō Park located in the town of Yōrō, Yōrō District, Gifu, Japan.

Summary 
The waterfall is 32 meters high and 4 meters wide. It was chosen as one of Japan’s Top 100 Waterfalls. The water from the falls is praised for its high quality, and is mentioned in a legend that tells the story of a dedicated son who offered the water, which tasted like sake to his ailing father who, upon drinking it, was revived. The Empress Genshō, who visited this area, renamed the period of her reign "Yōrō" saying, "Rei Springs art beautiful springs. And so doth nourish the old. Perhaps it be the spirit of the waters. I do [hereby] give amnesty under heaven, and fix the third year of the Reiki (era) anew to year 1 of the Yōrō (era)."

Yōrō Park extends from Yōrō Falls to the Nanno Sekigahara Line, a prefectural road that runs along the foot of the mountain. From the park's parking lot, one must climb a steep hillside road for 700 to 800 meters, but from about midway between the parking lot and the falls, there is a lift running. By taking this lift, one may reach the falls with comparative ease. Also, there is another parking lot nearer the falls. The carbonated beverages like Ramune and cider, which are made using the water, are also popular.

The cider that is made with the local water was once called "Yōrō Cider" and was produced in the town. In recent years, the production of this beverage has been taken over by a different company, and the product renamed "Yōrō Sanroku Cider."

Geography 
The waterfall is in the upstream part of the Taki Valley, which joins in Tsuta River (Tributary of Ibi River) then flows Ise Bay. 
Taki Valley is the source river on Mount Yōrō. 
Yōrō Station of YORO Railway CO.,LTD is the nearest station for the waterfall.
It is in the Ibi-Sekigahara-Yōrō Quasi-National Park
(List of national parks of Japan).
It is near the starting point for climbing Mount Yōrō and Mount Shō. The hiker often visits the waterfall. 
Also there is the Tōkai Nature Trail in the south soon.

Gallery

See also 

 Japan’s Top 100 Waterfalls
 Mount Yōrō
 Yōrō Station
 Ibi-Sekigahara-Yōrō Quasi-National Park
 Tōkai Nature Trail

References

External links 
Yōrō Park
Yōrō-chō Tourism Association

Tourist attractions in Gifu Prefecture
Landforms of Gifu Prefecture
Waterfalls of Japan